The Robert Chesley Award was an annual literary award, presented by Publishing Triangle to honour drama works by playwrights in the LGBT community. First presented in 1994, the award was named in memory of playwright Robert Chesley. The award was discontinued in 2008.

Winners
 1994 — Lisa Kron, Doric Wilson
 1995 — Victor Lodato
 1996 — Robert Patrick, Susan Miller
 1997 — Paula Vogel
 1998 — Chay Yew
 1999 — Madeleine Olnek
 2000 — Jeff Weiss
 2001 — María Irene Fornés
 2002 — Christopher Shinn, Sheila Callaghan
 2003 — H.M. Koutoukas, Alvin Carmines Jr.
 2004 — Rebecca Ranson, Jane Shepard
 2005 — Michael Kearns, Jorge Ignacio Cortiñas
 2006 — Kathleen Warnock, Megan Terry
 2007 — Eric Bentley, Chris Weikel

References

External links
 

Triangle Awards
Dramatist and playwright awards
Awards established in 2006
Awards disestablished in 2008
1994 establishments in the United States
2008 disestablishments in the United States